Vincit Oyj (Vincit Plc) is an internationally operating digital service provider, founded and headquartered in Finland. The company's services cover the entire digital value chain from management consulting to design, software development and software maintenance. The Group has subsidiaries in Finland and the United States. The Finnish customer-base is made up by large and medium-sized companies from several industries as well as the public sector.

A merger with Bilot, an IT-services company established in 2015, realized in 1.7.2022, saw Vincit's employee count soar to over 850.

Vincit Oyj is listed on Nasdaq First North Growth Market Finland.

Vincit's transparent company culture has been widely recognized and awarded across Finland, Europe, and the US.

History

Vincit Plc 2007–2016 
Mikko Kuitunen and Olli-Pekka Virtanen founded Vincit in 2007, with Kuitunen acting as CEO.

In autumn 2014 Vincit, then employing 100 people, opened two new offices in Helsinki. One focused on projects for the public sector, finance, commerce, and media, while the other developed medical systems in cooperation with GE Healthcare.

In July 2015, former Jolla CEO Tomi Pienimäki was appointed as Vincit's CEO. In August, Vincit merged with ICT service provider Javerdel Oy. The new company offered software development, devices, continuous services, server capacity, and financial services for companies and public administration. The merger raised Vincit's number of staff above 200. Vincit offered startups services that they couldn't otherwise afford in exchange for shares or after investing their own money into the start-up. After investing in 12 companies, Vincit decided to found a separate private equity company called Amor & Labor to manage its investments.

Vincit Plc 2016–2017 
In 2016, Vincit operated in Tampere and Helsinki, had a service center in Savonlinna, Finland, and an office in Palo Alto, California. In September, Vincit announced it was listing on First North Growth Market operated by Nasdaq Helsinki. The initial public offering began in September. Two-thirds of Vincit staff took part in the private offering to the employees.

In February 2017, Vincit announced the opening of a new office in Turku. In June, Vincit acquired XTOPLY, a design company based in California specializing in digital design and service design, and in November, Avoltus, a software company based in Turku, Finland. In October, Vincit acquired Linja Design, an IoT service design company located in Helsinki and Tampere. Next Vincit acquired Solid Angle Oy, a Finnish WordPress company.

Vincit Plc 2018–2020 
In January 2018, Vincit sold its service business Vincit Services Oy to DataCenter Finland Oy. Most of the services had become a part of Vincit during the Javerdel acquisition.

In June 2018, Mikko Kuitunen made a comeback as Vincit's CEO with an employment contract that stipulated that both the Vincit board of directors and staff had the power to fire the CEO.

In March 2018, Vincit announced plans to expand into Central Europe.

The total revenue for 2018 was EUR 43.5 million, an increase of 5.6% on the previous year. Operating profit was EUR 4.1 million, 9.5% of net sales and the result for the financial year was EUR 6.3 million, 14.6% of net sales. The number of employees at the end of the year was 430, as approximately 50 people were transferred to DataCenter Finland in connection with the sale of the ICT business.

In January 2019, Vincit acquired LeanCraft Innovations, a software company based in Oulu, Finland. In October, Vincit sold its Vincit SIGN business to Telia Finland.

The year 2019 was discordant but got clearer towards the end. The revenue totaled EUR 48.2 million, an increase of 10.9%. Adjusted operating profit was EUR 3.5 million, 7.2% of the revenue. The number of employees was 467 at the end of year. The revenue for Vincit California was €5.8 million, a rise of a whopping 39.3 percent.

In early 2020, VincitEAM and Vincit LaaS began to operate as incorporated companies. During the spring, the outbreak of the COVID-19 pandemic hindered Vincit's business activities. In the “humane cooperation negotiations” some of Vincit's employees decided to take unpaid leave voluntarily. In May, Vincit announced it would renew the web service of the Association for Finnish Work pro bono to support the economy during the exceptional circumstances.

Despite the exceptional circumstances, 2020 was an excellent year for Vincit's business. Revenue was EUR 52.4 million, an increase of 8.6%. Adjusted operating profit was EUR 7.6 million, 14.5% of net sales. The number of employees rose to 478.

Vincit Plc 2021–2022 
In January 2021, Vincit won a tender for expert and consulting services for digital development projects in the City of Helsinki together with Sitowise Oy. The total value of the four-year joint project is approximately EUR 25 million.

Vincit opened a new office in Kuopio, acquired the business of Vuria LLC and expanded operations to Arizona, and acquired the Jyväskylä-based Bonsky Digital Oy in 2021. Julius Manni took up the position of CEO on August 1, 2021, and Mikko Kuitunen became chairman of the board. At the end of June 2021, Vincit sold a significant part of its subsidiary LaaS Company Oy.

In August 2021, Vincit's quality system was awarded the ISO 13485 certificate, which signifies compliance with social and health services regulations in projects that develop software for medical devices.

In November 2021, Vincit announced its new strategy for 2022–2024. The company will focus on three business areas: comprehensive development of digital sales and customer experience, the design and implementation of digital services, and the development of maintenance services.

The year 2021 was a time of strong growth. Revenue totaled EUR 61.5 million, an increase of 17.5%. Adjusted operating profit was EUR 5.9 million, 9.6% of net sales. The number of employees at the end of the financial year was 579.

In February 2022, Vincit announced a merger agreement in which Bilot would merge with Vincit. In April, Vincit announced it would update its organizational structure and management team to support the new strategy and the acceleration of international growth.

The turnover for the first half of 2022 was EUR 35.8 million. The increase in turnover was 5.1 million euros, or 16.6%. On 1 July 2022, Bilot Oyj merged with Vincit Oyj. The renewed Vincit's offering combines modern customized software development, service and business design, data orientation and strong expertise in leading IT back-end systems. The strategy will be based on Vincit's strategy published in November 2021, and will continue to focus growth efforts on the development of customers' commercial capabilities, with digital sales and comprehensive customer experience at the center.

Organization 
The Vincit Group includes the parent company Vincit Plc as well as the subsidiaries Vincit Helsinki Oy, Vincit Jyväskylä Oy, Vincit California Inc, Vincit Arizona Inc and Vincit Solutions Oy. In Finland, Vincit has offices in Tampere, Helsinki, Turku, Oulu, Jyväskylä and Kuopio. In the United States, there are three offices in California: Palo Alto, Orange County and Santa Monica, as well as one in Phoenix, Arizona. With the Bilot merger in July 2022, Vincit's operations will expand to Sweden and Poland.

As of May 2022, Vincit's Management Team includes President and CEO Julius Manni; Ville Houttu, Vincit Country Director, USA; Mari Kuha, Vice President, Human Resources; Anssi Kuutti, Director, Talent & Delivery; Jan Landén, Vice President, Sales and Offering, Vincit Finland; Henna Niiranen, Director, DevOps & Platforms; Teemu Uotila, General Counsel, and Niklas Wasenius, CFO.

Vincit's Board of Directors consists of Mikko Kuitunen as chairman, Artti Aurasmaa as deputy chairman, as well as Mervi Airaksinen, Frank Korsström, Eka Ruola and Pekka Vähähyyppä.

Markets 
Vincit offers software development and ICT services for corporate and public sector customers. The majority of Vincit's clients in Finland are large or medium-sized enterprises and public sector actors.

Vincit specified its offering for 2022–2024: international growth is sought through comprehensive development of digital sales and the customer experience. Design and implementation of digital services will continue as the core business area, in addition to which, Vincit invests in the development of maintenance services.

The merger with Bilot will support the development of customers' commercial capabilities in line with the new strategic direction. The priority areas for international growth remain in the Nordic countries, Central Europe, and the United States.

Company culture 
The company culture at Vincit is relaxed and professional, taking into account the well-being and meaningful competence development of all employees.  
When Vincit was founded, the idea was to make a genuinely good workplace for all its employees. The thesis was that going to work should never suck, even on Mondays.
For this reason, there are no administrative supervisors, no budgets, no timecards at Vincit, nor any other killjoys commonly associated with office work. Instead, Vincit has earned a slew of awards for its management practices, revenue growth, well-being at work and human resources management. 

Vincit's company culture has been widely recognized and awarded over the years. In 2012 Vincit won the Workplace Well-being Accomplishment award, Työhyvinvointiteko  while in 2015, Vincit's Utopia project was awarded the Employee Wellbeing Accomplishment of the Year (Vuoden Henkilöstöteko).
The Great Place to Work Institute Finland awarded Vincit as the best workplace in Finland in 2014, 2015, and 2016  as well as in 2022.
 As for the best workplace in Europe, Vincit placed 8th in June 2014  and 3rd a year later, while taking the lead position in June 2016. In America, Vincit has been certified as a Great Place to Work in 2021 & 2022. 

Vincit was the fifth most attractive IT sector employer in Finland in October 2021 according to a survey conducted by the research and consulting company Universum. 

Vincit has earned great acclaims in the United States. The Orange County Business Journal has listed Vincit as one of the best companies to work for three years running. In 2020, Vincit was on Fast Company’s global list of Best Workplaces for Innovators.  Tech in Motion selected Vincit as a finalist for the 2021 Timmy Awards for Best Work Culture in Southern California.

Recognitions 
Vincit and its management have received various awards for entrepreneurship, business success, and growth, including:

 Vincit was among the top 10 finalists in the European Business Awards in 2011. Vincit also won the Ruban d’Honneur honorable mention and represented Finland in the 2013/2014 competition.
 In December 2011, The Finnish Enterprise Agencies awarded Vincit the New Entrepreneur of the year.
 In June 2012, Tietoviikko (Tivi) magazine awarded Vincit as the Tivi company of the year. CEO Kuitunen won the special price of Young Entrepreneur of the Year in the Ernst & Young Entrepreneur of the Year Awards and the Best Young Entrepreneur in Finland award granted by the Finnish Ministry of Economic Affairs and Employment.
 Kauppalehti magazine and OP Financial Group rewarded Vincit as the Company of the Year in November 2013.
 In November 2014, Junior Chamber International Finland awarded Mikko Kuitunen as the Outstanding Young Professional of the Year and in January 2015, he was one of the winners of the Most Marketing-minded Engineer 2014 competition.
 In 2016, the City of Tampere presented Kuitunen with the Tampere prize.
 In 2018, Ville Houttu, CEO of Vincit California, was named the Entrepreneur of the Year by the Greater Irvine Chamber of Commerce.
In 2021, Vincit placed 2,151 among the 5,000 most successful privately owned companies in the US.
In 2021, Vincit was also selected as a finalist for Outstanding Small Technology Companies in Octane's High Tech Awards.
In 2021, Vincit's HR technology product, Leadership as a Service, was a winner of TalentCulture's HR Tech Awards.
In 2022, Vincit California won a Silver Stevie for being one of the fastest growing companies employing under 100 people

References

External links 
 Official website

Software companies of Finland
Companies listed on Nasdaq Helsinki
2007 establishments in Finland
Companies based in Tampere